The Daniel McCook House is a historic antebellum house in Carrollton, Ohio, that was home to several of the "Fighting McCooks" who rose to fame during the American Civil War. The patriarch,  Daniel McCook Sr., was a major in the Union Army as well as a paymaster, and his sons rose to military prominence during the war.

The building is on the southwest corner of the Carrollton Public Square. Built in 1837, it is a perfect example of the popular Federal architecture. Its central door is framed by white side windows and a fan window above. A light sandstone arch surmounts the frame. The hipped roof is framed on both sides by two large chimneys.

The building became a National Historic Place in 1970, and is now a historic house museum operated by the Carroll County Historical Society. The house is owned by the Ohio History Connection. There are several period rooms and exhibits about the McCook family and the Civil War.

References

External links

 McCook House Civil War Museum  - Carroll County Historical Society
  McCook House - Ohio History Connection
 Remarkable Ohio article

Houses on the National Register of Historic Places in Ohio
Museums in Carroll County, Ohio
National Register of Historic Places in Carroll County, Ohio
 
Federal architecture in Ohio
Historic house museums in Ohio
Ohio History Connection
Houses in Carroll County, Ohio